In the 2004–05 season, USM Alger competed in the Division 1 for the 25th time, as well as the Algerian Cup.  It was their 10th consecutive season in the top flight of Algerian football. They were competing in Ligue 1, the CAF Champions League and the Algerian Cup.

Summary season
Since everything has an end, 2004–05 was for Usmistes the end of an era that has long been dreaming all lovers of the club. The fifth league title was won under the leadership of Mustapha Aksouh it is the last title for Saïd Allik as a president. In the last round, the struggle for survival was between CR Belouizdad and OMR El Annasser although USM Alger does not need to win, it crushed OMR El Annasser with a four, all scored by Michael Eneramo to be the youngest player to score a hat-trick in USM Alger's first team, at 19 years old. The reason why Al Ittihad played with such strength goes back to the 1993–94 season in second division, when the struggle for promoted was between ASO Chlef and USM Alger, and in the last round ASO Chlef won against OMR El Annasser it took place at Stade 20 Août 1955 and USM Alger accused them of facilitating their mission, to go up to the first division by direct match difference.

Squad list
Players and squad numbers last updated on 1 September 2004.Note: Flags indicate national team as has been defined under FIFA eligibility rules. Players may hold more than one non-FIFA nationality.

Competitions

Overview

Division 1

League table

Results summary

Results by round

Matches

Algerian Cup

Champions League

Group stage

Champions League

First round

Second round

CAF Confederation Cup

Play-off round

Squad information

Playing statistics

Appearances (Apps.) numbers are for appearances in competitive games only including sub appearances
Red card numbers denote:   Numbers in parentheses represent red cards overturned for wrongful dismissal.

Goalscorers
Includes all competitive matches. The list is sorted alphabetically by surname when total goals are equal.

Clean sheets
Includes all competitive matches.

Transfers

In

Out

References

USM Alger seasons
Algerian football clubs 2004–05 season